Janus was an academic journal published in Amsterdam in the French language from 1896 to 1990, devoted to the history of medicine and the history of science.

Founding and early history
The journal was founded in 1896 by Carel Eduard Daniëls and Hendrik Peypers, with the French subtitle  [International Archive for the History of Medicine and Medical Geography]. In his 1895 doctoral dissertation in history, Peypers had already quoted Schlegel concerning the Janus-like viewpoint of the historian, "the prophet who also looks backwards":

From 1915 onward, the journal called itself the  [journal of the Dutch Society for the History of Medical, Exact, and Natural Sciences]. The society was founded at the same time as the journal, and existed primarily to publish the journal. This series of the journal ended in 1941, interrupted by World War II.

Post-war revival
In 1957, the same journal was restarted, this time subtitled  [International Review for the History of Science, Medicine, Pharmacy, and Technology]. It had  as co-editor; Bruins had recently returned to Amsterdam from teaching mathematics in Baghdad, and in 1969 he would be named professor of the history of mathematics at the University of Amsterdam. In 1963 he took over full editorship of the journal. Under the influence of Bruins, the journal began including the history of mathematics in its repertoire of topics.

Bruins died in 1990, and his journal ceased publication in the same year.

References

French-language journals
History of medicine journals
History of science journals
Publications established in 1896
Publications disestablished in 1990